Farewell to Reason is a 1987 book by the Austrian philosopher of science
Paul Feyerabend. The book includes some reprinted essays published in other venues and was published by Verso Books, which also published Against Method and Science in a Free Society. The primary goal of the book is to trace the historical origins of "rationalism" and argue for a version of relativism and cultural diversity.

Translations
Farewell to Reason has been translated into five languages:
 French translation by Baudouin Jurdant: Adieu à la raison, Seuil: Paris 1989, 373 pp.
 German translation by Jürgen Blasius: Irrwege der Vernunft, Suhrkamp: Frankfurt am Main 1989, 471 pp. Reprinted 1990.
 Italian translation by Marcello D'Agostino: Addio alla ragione, Armando: Roma 1990, 320 pp.
 Japanese translation: Risei yo saraba, Hoseidaigakushuppankyoku: Tokyo 1992, 34+399 pp.
 Portuguese translation: Adeus à razão, UNESP: São Paulo 2010, 399 pp.

The book was reprinted in 1988, 1990, 1993, 1994, 1996, and 1999. A 2nd edition was released including a new preface by Feyerabend.

Content
Farewell to Reason begins with a lengthy chapter on relativism. He distinguishes it from absolutism, or the view that some views are entirely truth and their alternatives are false, pluralism, where multiple views are held simultaneously without critical interaction, and scientific pluralism where different traditions must critically engage with one another. He argues that there is no reason to necessarily accept science over other traditions and that traditions can learn from one another. Conintuing on arguments made in Science in a Free Society, Feyerabend spells out the political implications of relativism including the claim that all traditions should be given equal access to resources necessary to develop their traditions. He continues by situating his relativism within a historical tradition including Herodotus, Protagoras, and  several democratic theorists.

The second chapter argues that Xenophanes, who was praised by Karl Popper for inventing scientific rationalism, never provides an argument against the Homeric gods. Rather, Xenophanes begs the question and assumes that defenders of the Homeric worldview accept that there can be a single God. Xenophanes, rather than inventing rational criticism, provides an instructive episode in the history of relativism.

This is followed by several chapters that are reprinted essays on various topics including the role of theories in simplifying nature (a theme that would be explored in more detail in Conquest of Abundance), creativity, progress in the sciences, arts, and philosophy, Mach's principle, incommensurability, Aristotle's theory of mathematics, and critical reviews of some of Popper's books. 

The final parts of the book include a lengthly letter where he argues, amongst other things, that cultural exchanges do not require shared assumptions or a shared language as well as a titular essay where he argues that philosophy should be abandoned as a practice and replaced by participation in particular traditions.

Further reading

References

1987 books
Books by Paul Feyerabend
Criticism of science
Verso Books books
English-language books
Philosophy of science books
Science studies
Criticism of rationalism